The term Bulgarian parliamentary election, 1923 may refer to:

Bulgarian parliamentary election, April 1923 
Bulgarian parliamentary election, November 1923